"What the Fuck Are We Saying?" is a song written and recorded by American singer Lenny Kravitz and released in September 1991, as the fifth single from his second studio album Mama Said.

Reception
Christopher A. Daniel of Albumism stated, "On the concerned “What the Fuck Are We Saying?,” Kravitz takes crash courses in studying Stevie Wonder’s lyricism on the 1973 Grammy-winning LP Innervisions and Brian Eno’s (or maybe Kraftwerk’s) synthesizer methodology."

Track listing

Charts

References

External links
 

Lenny Kravitz songs
1991 songs
Songs written by Lenny Kravitz